Blue Cliff College is a for-profit technical school with campuses located in Gulfport, Mississippi, Fayetteville, Arkansas, and five locations in Louisiana: Lafayette, Shreveport, Houma, Metairie, and Alexandria. The college offers diplomas for careers in Cosmetology, Esthetics, Dialysis Technician, Health Information Management, Billing and Coding, HVAC, massage therapy, medical assisting. 

The name of the college is taken from an ancient Zen text, the Blue Cliff Record, containing dialogues between Zen masters and their students.

All of the Blue Cliff College campuses include lecture rooms, massage training rooms, administrative offices, lounge areas, and resource rooms for studies. Each school has compatible resources and technologies with the programs they offer. 

BCC was founded in 1987. In June 1989, the College received its Proprietary School License from the state of Louisiana. In 1998, the College received accreditation from the Accrediting Commission of Career Schools and Colleges (ACCSC). By 2007 Blue Cliff had expanded to the current locations in Alexandria, LA, Houma, LA, Metairie, LA (Cleary Ave.), Lafayette, LA, Metairie, LA (Veterans Memorial Blvd), Shreveport, LA, Gulfport, MS, Fayetteville, AR (N. College Ave.) and, Fayetteville, AR (Hiram Davis Place).

The school was purchased by Education Management, Inc., in 1999, which in turn was acquired by Quad Partners in 2008.

External links

College Website

Vocational education in the United States
For-profit universities and colleges in the United States